James Lawrence Dolan (born May 11, 1955) is an American businessman who serves as executive chairman and CEO of Madison Square Garden Sports and Madison Square Garden Entertainment and executive chairman of MSG Networks. As the companies' chairman, Dolan oversees all operations within the company and also supervises day-to-day operations of its professional sports teams, the New York Knicks and New York Rangers as well as their regional sports networks, which include MSG Network and MSG Plus. Dolan previously served as CEO of Cablevision until its sale in June 2016.

Early life
Dolan is one of six children of Cablevision founder Charles Dolan and his wife, Helen Ann Dolan. He is of Irish descent. After originally pursuing a career in music, Dolan eventually switched to a major in communications at SUNY New Paltz and began working for Cablevision in various capacities including sales before eventually being dispatched to Cleveland by his father to manage the launching of a sports radio station.  In 1995, he was made CEO of Cablevision. Throughout his early adult life, Dolan battled drug and alcohol problems and was reportedly known for having a volatile temper. In 1993, he went to drug rehabilitation at the Hazelden clinic in Center City, Minnesota.

Business management
Dolan opposed his father's proposed Voom satellite service, which became a polarizing controversy among Cablevision's board of directors. While supporters argued Voom could propel Cablevision into the future emerging satellite market and a wider customer base, opponents of the plan, including James Dolan, argued it was too expensive with no expense relief for the foreseeable future. In the end, the younger Dolan prevailed and Voom was shut down. This was an instrumental event in Dolan emerging from his father's shadow, albeit reluctantly, as a viable businessman.

His business career has included multiple failures, which include purchasing the failing Wiz electronics and entertainment chain, which ended up posting losses of $250 million before being liquidated, and the Clearview Cinemas chain which has failed to generate any significant revenue.

Philanthropy
Dolan fostered Cablevision's philanthropic partnership with The Lustgarten Foundation, a private supporter of pancreatic cancer research. Together with Charles Dolan and former Cablevision Vice Chairman and Madison Square Garden Chairman Marc Lustgarten. Dolan established the Foundation in 1998. In 2008, Cablevision made a multi-year commitment to underwrite the Foundation's costs, ensuring that 100 percent of every donation goes to researching this disease. With Dolan's backing, Cablevision used its assets to advance the curePC campaign, aimed at increasing public awareness of pancreatic cancer and is responsible for organizing the Holiday Rock & Roll Bash, the Foundation's annual fundraiser.

Dolan played a role in organizing the recent "12-12-12" benefit concert, which raised an initial $50 million for the victims of Hurricane Sandy, with additional money still coming in. Other benefit concerts included "The Concert For New York City," which generated more than $35 million in aid for 9/11 victims and heroes, and "From The Big Apple to The Big Easy," which raised nearly $9 million for Hurricane Katrina relief. Dolan supports MSG's ongoing commitment to the community, particularly through the Garden of Dreams Foundation, the non-profit charity that partners with MSG to help children facing obstacles throughout the New York metropolitan area.

Sports management
In 1994, Paramount Communications, the owner of Madison Square Garden, was acquired by Viacom, who in turn sold the MSG properties to Cablevision and ITT Corporation, which had 50% ownership each. ITT sold its share to Cablevision three years later.

In 1999, Dolan was given an increased role in managing Cablevision's sports properties and is now the primary manager of these assets. The teams under his domain include most notably the National Basketball Association's New York Knicks, the National Hockey League's New York Rangers, the Women's National Basketball Association's New York Liberty, and the American Hockey League's Hartford Wolf Pack.

As Chairman of Madison Square Garden, he supervises day-to-day operations of its professional sports teams and regional sports networks, which include MSG Network and MSG Plus. He also serves as a governor of the Knicks and Rangers to their respective leagues.

Controversies

New York Knicks
Like the Rangers, the Knicks performed abysmally in the early 2000s. Unlike the Rangers, they have yet to fully recover, which fans mostly blame on Dolan's management missteps. Although the Knicks made the NBA Finals in 1999, they did not post another winning season until the 2012–13 season. Furthermore, the Knicks did not make the playoffs at any point between the 2003–04 and 2010–11 seasons, which both ended in the first round with four-game sweeps of the Knicks. In 2007, NBA Commissioner David Stern criticized Dolan's management of the Knicks, saying "they're not a model of intelligent management." One widely criticized decision was to give shooting guard Allan Houston a 6-year, $100 million maximum contract in 2001, when no other team had offered Houston more than $75 million. Houston retired due to injury after just four seasons and with over $40 million remaining on his contract.

In 2003, Dolan hired Isiah Thomas as Team President of Basketball Operations and General Manager to replace embattled executive Scott Layden. Thomas made aggressive moves to re-tool and upgrade the Knicks' roster through trades, the NBA Draft, and free agency. Despite the talent Thomas imported, the team did not perform up to expectations and Thomas was often the target of the frustration of Knicks fans; Dolan was also on the receiving end of the ire of Knicks fans for his commitment to Thomas in spite of Thomas' sometimes questionable decisions.

After the 2004–05 season, the Knicks signed head coach Larry Brown to a 5-year, $50 million contract. After just one (losing) season, Brown was fired and the team bought-out Brown's contract for $18 million. Brown walked away with a total of $28 million for coaching the Knicks for just one year.

After firing Larry Brown, Isiah Thomas assumed the duties of head coach of the Knicks. During a staged interview on MSG Network, Dolan gave Thomas an ultimatum to show "evident progress" or potentially be fired. In the latter half of the 2006–07 season, with the Knicks within reach of a playoff spot, Dolan signed Thomas to a multi-year contract extension. The team subsequently fell out of contention and Dolan was castigated in many quarters for his extension of Thomas's contract. The next season, Dolan stripped Thomas of his front office duties because Thomas had taken the Knicks to the playoffs just once during his tenure. New team President Donnie Walsh removed Thomas as head coach upon the conclusion of the season.

Other coaches that also had short-lived tenures as head coaches of the Knicks include Don Chaney (2001–2003) and Lenny Wilkens (2003–2005). Like Thomas and Brown, they remained on the Knicks' payroll following their departure from the bench due to multi-year contracts signed with the owner (and in Chaney's case, 2 separate contract extensions).

In 2007, Dolan was named as a defendant in a sexual harassment lawsuit submitted by a former Knicks executive, Anucha Browne-Sanders. Browne-Sanders accused Dolan of firing her out of spite after she complained about sexual harassment from Isiah Thomas. The court ruled in favor of Brown-Sanders and Dolan had to pay $3 million of the $11 million settlement. MSG was responsible for paying the remainder of the settlement.

In July 2012, Dolan faced criticism for allowing popular Knicks point guard Jeremy Lin to sign with the Houston Rockets without matching their $25.1 million offer.

In February 2015, Dolan responded to a letter from Irving Bierman, a 73-year-old lifelong Knicks fan, that criticized Dolan's ownership of the Knicks and questioned his leadership with a seething letter of his own, telling the fan to "root for the Nets because the Knicks don't want you" and that Bierman was "a sad person" and probably an "alcoholic maybe". Dolan later addressed the issue with the press, but did not apologize, only saying the letter was a case of "tit for tat" and declaring the incident "over". Newly appointed NBA Commissioner Adam Silver did not reprimand or penalize Dolan, but instead called Dolan a "consummate New Yorker" who received "an unkind email and responded with an unkind email".

On February 9, 2017, former Knicks player Charles Oakley was engaged in a yelling match with Dolan at Madison Square Garden during a Knicks–Clippers game and removed following an altercation with MSG security. Oakley contends that Dolan has ignored, if not ostracized, him. On March 11, 2019, prompted by a similar incident two days earlier with a fan, Oakley remarked that Dolan tries to bully everyone because he has money and power, stating there was very little reason for reconciliation with him after the incident.

In March 2019, Dolan threatened a ban towards a fan at Madison Square Garden after he yelled "sell the team" at Dolan. Discussing the situation on TV, ESPN questioned the reasoning behind his reaction and concluded that Commissioner Silver should compel Dolan to apologize to the fan by selling the team. Some fans of the team responded to the outrage by giving away free t-shirts saying "St. Patty Says Ban Dolan" on their March 17 game against the Los Angeles Lakers, though some of the shirts got confiscated by security before fans entered the arena.

In March 2021, Dolan had a fan removed from a Knicks game at Madison Square Garden for wearing a t-shirt reading, "Ban Dolan" in protest of Dolan's management of the organization and treatment of retired Knicks players.

New York Rangers
After winning the Stanley Cup in 1994, the Rangers saw a decline in performance in the wake of Dolan's increased role in managing the team and failed to make the playoffs from the 1997–98 season until the 2004–05 NHL lockout, despite leading the league in payroll in most of those years. This was the longest playoff drought in the franchise's history, in part due to questionable, expensive free-agent signings, such as Eric Lindros, Pavel Bure, and Theo Fleury. Despite fan and media calls for the team's general manager Glen Sather to be fired for the organization's shortcomings, Sather was retained. However, since the resolution of the NHL lockout in 2005, Dolan has allowed Sather to rebuild from the ground up, which has led to a revival of the club and the organization, leading to a trip to the Eastern Conference finals in 2012, their first since 1997, and to the Stanely Cup Finals in 2014. However, when Dolan spoke of the team's Stanley Cup chances in January 2012, Rangers head coach John Tortorella took issue with his remarks.
"I have my owner up here talking about a Stanley Cup. That's a bunch of bullshit," Tortorella said in response. "We need to take it one game at a time."

On January 26, 2023, Dolan threatened to ban alcohol at an upcoming Rangers game after the New York State Liquor Authority opened an investigation into his use of facial recognition.

New York Liberty
On May 5, 2015, Dolan announced that Isiah Thomas would serve as president of the WNBA's Liberty. Considering Thomas' history being both a failed President/GM of the Knicks and Thomas being implicated in the Anucha Browne-Sanders sexual harassment incident, Dolan's judgment was questioned by many fans and members of the press.

Los Angeles Clippers Arena
In an ongoing lawsuit between the Madison Square Garden Company and the city of Inglewood, California, Dolan is said to be trying to avoid being deposed in the case. The Los Angeles Clippers want to build a new arena, which would compete directly with The Forum, which is owned by the Madison Square Garden Company. In December 2018, the Madison Square Garden Company was countersued by the Clippers for trying to prevent the construction of a competing arena. In March 2019, leaked emails revealed that Irving Azoff attempted to lure the Los Angeles Lakers back to The Forum after their lease at the Staples Center was up. Despite nothing coming of the proposal, Azoff's proposal to re-purpose The Forum was seen as a way of preventing the Clippers from building their own arena in Inglewood and ensuring that the Madison Square Garden Company got an unfair advantage over rival AEG, which already owns part of the Lakers. In the summer of 2019, details emerged in regard to Dolan's tactics being used to prevent the construction of the competing arena. The Madison Square Garden Company had spent money trying to influence Inglewood's mayoral election as a way of trying to stop the arena from being built. They had also funded community groups to help their opposition to the arena.

Media policies
Dolan rarely speaks with members of the media and communicates to the press through released statements or in interviews with MSG Network. In 2000, Dolan instituted media training for all Garden employees who might deal with the press and instituted an ironclad rule against team personnel criticizing others in the organization via the media. Under Dolan's watch MSG implemented controversial media policies limiting access to players. Some of these measures included prohibiting reporters and Knicks' beat writers from interviewing players without an MSG public relations official present, forbidding one-on-one interviews, and excommunicating writers who write articles critical of the organization. The policies also forbid the MSG Network from being critical of the Knicks and the Rangers, regardless of their performance. Such measures were not standard practice for other NBA teams. In addition, the Knicks did not make their medical staff available to the press. In 2004, longtime broadcaster Marv Albert's contract was not renewed by MSG Network, allegedly because of his criticism of the Knicks' play.

Personal life
Dolan lives on Long Island with his wife Kristin, whom he named the chief executive officer of AMC Networks in 2023. He has been married twice and has six sons. His second wedding took place at Donald Trump's Mar-a-Lago in Palm Beach, Florida. Dolan is the son of Cablevision founder Charles Dolan, and nephew of Cleveland Guardians owner Larry Dolan. On March 28, 2020, it was announced that he had been diagnosed with COVID-19 amidst the COVID-19 pandemic. He contributed to Donald Trump's 2020 presidential reelection campaign.

Hobbies
Dolan performs blues-inspired rock as the singer for JD & The Straight Shot. After a show in New York City in 2017, one reviewer wrote that Dolan "sings like he’s trying not to cough, and it’s possible he can’t play the guitar. Worse, his songs belie his status as a cosplaying bluesman; most of his lyrics simply summarize current events or books that he’s read as if he were presenting a 10th grade English class project." On August 1, 2018, his band released the song titled "I Should've Known" inspired by his own experiences perpetuating sexual harassment from the album The Great Divide. The album was released in March 2019.

References

External links
 MSG profile
 New York Magazine article from 2004
 JD and the Straight Shot

1956 births
Living people
American chairpersons of corporations
American chief executives
Cablevision
Dolan family
New York Knicks owners
New York Rangers owners
People from Massapequa, New York
State University of New York at New Paltz alumni
Women's National Basketball Association executives
New York Knicks executives
Madison Square Garden Sports
Madison Square Garden executives